Giorgi Gakhokidze (born 5 November 1975) is a Georgian former professional footballer who played as a midfielder or forward for PSV Eindhoven, Maccabi Haifa, FC Twente and Metalurh Donetsk among others. Between 1996 and 2006 he was also a member of the Georgia national team.

Club career

Early career 
Gakhokidze was born in Tbilisi, Georgian SSR. He started his career at Metalurgi Rustavi before moving to Georgian top club FC Dinamo Tbilisi, but did not play any matches and moved to FC Kolkheti-1913 Poti and later to Spartak-Alania Vladikavkaz, to play in the Russian league. Dutch giants PSV Eindhoven showed interest in the player and brought him into the Netherlands. In his first season, he was unable to gain himself a spot in the first team and was sent on a loan deal with Maccabi Haifa F.C. where he developed himself into a better player.

Breakthrough and downfall 
Back at PSV Gakhokidze still struggled to play a decent number of matches, but in the 2001–02 season things changed. Gakhokidze played in 25 of PSV's 34 matches that season. However, mainly due to injuries he only got a total of eight matches in the following season. Recovered from the injuries he moved to FC Twente and had a good season with a lot of match rhythm and some goals as well.

Gakhokidze felt the need to return to the eastern part of Europe and switched to Ukraine based Metalurg Donetsk. At this team however he only came to a total of two matches, while at his following team FC Krylya Sovetov Samara he did not play at all. His former team FC Twente decided to contract him again, but injuries forced him to set back most of the time and he only came to 19 appearances from 2005 to the end of 2006. On 29 December 2006 Gakhokidze decided to terminate his contract and end his career at the age of 31.

International career 
Besides his club appearances Gakhokidze also played in 21 matches for the Georgian national team, and scored 3 goals.

Career statistics

External links 
Career, goals, games, photos

1975 births
Living people
Footballers from Tbilisi
Footballers from Georgia (country)
FC Spartak Vladikavkaz players
PSV Eindhoven players
Maccabi Haifa F.C. players
Expatriate footballers in Israel
FC Twente players
FC Metalurh Donetsk players
FC Dinamo Tbilisi players
Erovnuli Liga players
Eredivisie players
Israeli Premier League players
Russian Premier League players
Ukrainian Premier League players
Georgia (country) international footballers
Expatriate footballers from Georgia (country)
Expatriate footballers in Ukraine
Expatriate footballers in Russia
Expatriate footballers in the Netherlands
Expatriate sportspeople from Georgia (country) in Ukraine
Expatriate sportspeople from Georgia (country) in Russia
Expatriate sportspeople from Georgia (country) in the Netherlands
Expatriate sportspeople from Georgia (country) in Israel
Association football forwards
Association football midfielders